Lorenzo Relova (January 20, 1916 – April 23, 2014) was a Filipino judge who served as the 103rd Associate Justice of the Supreme Court from May 14, 1982, until January 19, 1986, during the Marcos era. He was the country's oldest living Supreme Court justice at the time of his death in 2014.

Early life and education 
Relova was born on January 20, 1916, in Pila, Laguna, Philippines. His father, Jose Diaz Relova, was the first lawyer to practice in Pila  and uncle Regino Diaz Relova was a lieutenant colonel in the Katipunan in the province of Laguna, Philippines.

Lorenzo Relova taught as a law professor at Ateneo Law School for more than forty years. In 2012, he was inducted into the university's Professors of Law Hall of Fame.

Death 

Relova died on April 23, 2014, at the age of 98. A memorial was held at Magallanes Church in Makati.

References

1916 births
2014 deaths
Associate Justices of the Supreme Court of the Philippines
Legal educators
Academic staff of Ateneo de Manila University
People from Laguna (province)